R. Eden Martin is an American lawyer. Martin was a partner at the law firm Sidley Austin LLP from 1975 to 2004. Martin has served as President of The Commercial Club of Chicago since 1999. He is a member of the Boards of Directors of the Chicago Board Options Exchange, and Nicor Inc., a Life Trustee of the Chicago Symphony Orchestra and a member of the Board of Trustees of Northwestern University.  He has been an Aon Corporation director since 2002 and serves as Chairman of Aon Foundation.  He has also served on the boards of the University of Illinois Foundation, the Chicago History Museum, and the Ravinia Festival.

Awards 
Inducted as a Laureate of The Lincoln Academy of Illinois and awarded the Order of Lincoln (the State's highest honor) by the Governor of Illinois in 2017.

References

External links
Aon Website

Living people
Year of birth missing (living people)
Lawyers from Chicago
University of Illinois Urbana-Champaign alumni
Harvard Law School alumni
People associated with Sidley Austin